Minersville is the name of places:
United States
 Minersville, Ohio
 Minersville, Pennsylvania
 Minersville, Utah
 Minersville, Wisconsin